William Leon Behr (July 7, 1919 – August 6, 1997) was an American professional basketball player. He played in the National Basketball League for the Hammond Ciesar All-Americans in 1940–41 and averaged 3.5 points per game.

References 

1919 births
1997 deaths
American men's basketball players
United States Army personnel of World War II
Basketball players from Indiana
Guards (basketball)
Hammond Ciesar All-Americans players
People from Frankfort, Indiana